Baima is a town under the administration of Lishui District, Nanjing, Jiangsu, China. , it has six residential communities and four villages under its administration:
Neighborhoods
Baima
Jingu
Shangyang Community
Gexin Community
Zhujiabian Community
Bailong Community

Villages
Shitouzhai Village
Caojiaqiao Village
Dashuxia Village
Fushan Village

References 

Township-level divisions of Jiangsu
Geography of Nanjing